The Appalachian mixed mesophytic forests is an ecoregion of the temperate broadleaf and mixed forests biome, as defined by the World Wildlife Fund. It consists of mesophytic plants west of the Appalachian Mountains in the Southeastern United States.

This ecoregion consists of the following EPA level III ecoregions:
 Southwestern Appalachians (ecoregion)
 Central Appalachians (ecoregion)
 Western Allegheny Plateau (ecoregion)

Setting
This ecoregion is located in the plains and hill country west of the Appalachians in northwest Alabama and east central Tennessee, eastern Kentucky, western North Carolina and Virginia, most of West Virginia, western Maryland, southeastern Ohio and western Pennsylvania. This ecoregion also occurs in scattered disjuncts in the Ozark and Ouachita Mountains of Arkansas, Missouri, and extreme eastern Oklahoma. These forests are known for their rich diversity of plants and animals, which is due to several contributing factors, especially that the area was an unglaciated refugium for many species. It shares species with the high elevation Appalachian-Blue Ridge forests to the east, the hardwood forests to the west, and the mixed hardwood/conifer forests to the south.

Climate
The climate varies from humid continental in the north to humid subtropical in the south.

Flora
They are one of the most biologically diverse temperate forest regions on earth. It has an unusually diverse tree flora, with as many as 30 tree species at a single site including many relics of the ancient forest that once covered North America more widely. Along with the forest there is a rich undergrowth of ferns, fungi, herbaceous plants, shrubs and small trees as well as areas of glade, heath, shale, peat bog and cranberry bog.

Mesophytic forests
Mesophytic forests are found on deep and enriched soils in sheltered topography such as coves and low-elevation slopes. They are often found near small streams. The herb layer is very rich and, in undisturbed areas, the trees can grow very large. 
Typical trees include sugar maple (Acer saccharum), beech (Fagus grandifolia), tuliptree (Liriodendron tulipifera), basswood (Tilia americana), northern red oak (Quercus rubra), cucumber tree (Magnolia acuminata), and black walnut (Juglans nigra). Other trees found here are eastern hemlock (Tsuga canadensis), white ash (Fraxinus americana), sweetgum (Liquidambar styraciflua), and yellow buckeye (Aesculus flava).

Dry calcareous forests
The southern Ridge and Valley/Cumberland dry calcareous forests occur on dry to dry-mesic calcareous habitats on low escarpments of the Cumberland Plateau. They are often found on deep soils in a variety landscapes within their range. Trees are mainly oaks and hickories, with other species less abundant. Oaks include white oak (Quercus alba), northern red oak (Quercus rubra), post oak (Quercus stellata), chinkapin oak (Quercus muehlenbergii), and Shumard oak (Quercus shumardii). Hickories include shagbark hickory (Carya ovata). Other trees can be sugar maple (Acer saccharum), eastern red-cedar (Juniperus virginiana), or pines.

Appalachian cove forests
Appalachian cove forests are found in sheltered concave slopes with a moist environment. Characteristic tree include yellow buckeye (Aesculus flava), sugar maple (Acer saccharum), white ash (Fraxinus americana), basswood (Tilia americana), tuliptree (Liriodendron tulipifera), Carolina silverbell (Halesia tetraptera), eastern hemlock (Tsuga canadensis), beech (Fagus grandifolia), cucumber tree (Magnolia acuminata), and Fraser magnolia (Magnolia fraseri).

Dry-mesic oak forests
Dry-mesic oak forests cover large areas at lower and middle elevations on flat to gently rolling terrain. Mature stands have a variety of oak and hickory species adapted to dry-mesic conditions. Oaks include northern red oak (Quercus rubra), white oak (Quercus alba), black oak (Quercus velutina), and scarlet oak (Quercus coccinea); hickories include mockernut hickory (Carya tomentosa), shagbark hickory (Carya ovata), red hickory (Carya ovalis), and pignut hickory (Carya glabra). In addition, red maple (Acer rubrum), sweet birch (Betula lenta), and yellow birch (Betula alleghaniensis) are common; sugar maple (Acer saccharum) is occasional. In areas that have been recently disturbed, white pine (Pinus strobus), Virginia pine (Pinus virginiana), or tulip tree (Liriodendron tulipifera) can be abundant. Areas of impeded drainage sometimes harbor small wetlands, including non-forested seeps or forested wetlands with red maple (Acer rubrum), swamp white oak (Quercus bicolor), or black tupelo (Nyssa sylvatica).

Dry oak forests and woodlands
The Allegheny-Cumberland dry oak forest and woodland forest system is found on acidic soils on the Allegheny and Cumberland plateaus, and ridges in the southern Ridge and Valley. The forests are typically dominated by white oak (Quercus alba), southern red oak (Quercus falcata), chestnut oak (Quercus prinus), scarlet oak (Quercus coccinea), with lesser amounts of red maple (Acer rubrum), pignut hickory (Carya glabra), and mockernut hickory (Carya tomentosa). A few shortleaf pines (Pinus echinata) or Virginia pines (Pinus virginiana) may occur, particularly adjacent to escarpments or following fire. Sprouts of chestnut (Castanea dentata) can often be found where it was formerly a common tree.

Low-elevation pine forests
Southern Appalachian low-elevation pine forests occur on a variety of topographic and landscape positions, including ridgetops, upper- and mid-slopes, and in lower elevations (generally below ) such as mountain valleys. These forests dominated by shortleaf pine (Pinus echinata) and Virginia pine (Pinus virginiana). Pitch pine (Pinus rigida) may sometimes be present. Hardwoods are sometimes abundant, especially dry-site oaks such as southern red oak (Quercus falcata), chestnut oak (Quercus prinus), and scarlet oak (Quercus coccinea), but also pignut hickory (Carya glabra), red maple (Acer rubrum), and others. The shrub layer may be well-developed, with hillside blueberry (Vaccinium pallidum), black huckleberry (Gaylussacia baccata), or other acid-tolerant species most characteristic. Herbs are usually sparse but may include narrowleaf silkgrass (Pityopsis graminifolia) and Goat-rue (Tephrosia virginiana).

Montane oak forests
Montane oak forests occur on exposed ridges and on south- to west-facing slopes at middle elevations. Soils are thin and nutrient-poor and trees are often stunted and wind-flagged. Northern red oak (Quercus rubra) and white oak (Quercus alba) are common, as are sprouts of American chestnut (Castanea dentata). Winterberry (Ilex montana), flame azalea (Rhododendron calendulaceum), catawba rhododendron (Rhododendron catawbiense), and great rhododendron (Rhododendron maximum) are common shrubs.

Hemlock-northern hardwood forests
Hemlock-northern hardwood forests are found at higher elevations. They include yellow birch (Betula alleghaniensis), mountain maple (Acer spicatum), sugar maple (Acer saccharum), beech (Fagus grandifolia), and eastern hemlock (Tsuga canadensis). Mountain laurel (Kalmia latifolia) and rhododendron (Rhododendron spp.) are found in the understory.

Spruce-fir forests
Spruce-fir forests occur at the highest elevations, above . Their environment is cool and wet, with frequent fog and precipitation. Red spruce (Picea rubens) and Fraser fir (Abies fraseri) dominate the forest canopy.

Bogs
Cranberry bogs harbor species typical of ecoregions found to the north. These species include cranberry and blueberry (Vaccinium spp.), bog rosemary (Andromeda glaucophylla), and buckbean (Menyanthes trifoliata). These bogs are relicts that have survived since the last glacial period.

Other habitats
More unique, restricted habitats within these forests include glades, heath barrens, shale barrens, and sphagnum bogs. These often support endemic plants and land snails.

Prehistoric period 
During the Last Glacial Maximum about 18,000 years ago, the influence of Arctic air masses and boreal vegetation extended to about 33° N. latitude, the approximate latitude of Birmingham and Atlanta.  Forests of the glacial period were dominated by various spruces (Picea spp.) and jack pine; fir (Abies spp.) was abundant in some locations. With the exception of the absence of certain prairie elements, the understories of these forests were generally typical of modern spruce-fir forests within and near Canada.  Temperate deciduous forests dominated from about 33° to 30° N. latitude, including most of the glacial Gulf Coast from about 84° W. longitude.  Regional climate was similar to or slightly drier than modern conditions. Oak, hickory, chestnut, and southern pine species were abundant. Walnuts, beech, sweetgum, alder, birch, tulip poplar, elms, hornbeams (Carpinus spp.), basswoods, and others that are generally common in modern southern deciduous forests were also common then.  Grasses, sedges, and sunflowers were also common.

Fauna
The woodlands of the area are rich in wildlife. In particular they are important habitat for migrating birds including wood warblers, vireos, and thrushes. The rivers of the ecoregion have the highest species richness of any freshwater ecosystem. In particular, there are a large number of endemic fish and shellfish species.

Threats 
This ecoregion is considered critically endangered with 95% of the habitat degraded or converted to commercial forest. Large areas have been destroyed and fragmented through surface mining, including mountaintop removal. Large areas have also been logged and then converted to plantations of fast-growing tree species, such as Loblolly Pine (Pinus taeda) which are then used to produce wood pulp, which is particularly a problem in the Cumberland Plateau of Tennessee. Another threat to habitats come from growing numbers of deer. Major rivers in the ecoregion, such as the Tennessee River, have been dammed. This has resulted in the threatened or endangered status of many species of native fish, amphibians, and shellfish.

Natural areas 

The remaining forest is mostly found in protected areas. 
 Alabama
 Monte Sano State Park
 Oak Mountain State Park
 Talladega National Forest
 Cheaha Wilderness
 William B. Bankhead National Forest
 Sipsey Wilderness
 Georgia
 Cloudland Canyon State Park
 Kentucky
 Blanton Forest State Nature Preserve
 Big South Fork National River and Recreation Area
 Cumberland Gap National Historical Park
 Daniel Boone National Forest
 Beaver Creek Wilderness
 Kentenia State Forest
 Kentucky Ridge State Forest
 Robinson Forest
 Maryland
 Garrett State Forest
 Potomac State Forest
 Ohio
 Ales Run Wilderness Area
 Beaver Creek State Park
 Blue Rock State Forest
 Brush Creek State Forest
 Brush Creek Wilderness Area
 Burr Oak State Park
 Clear Creek Nature Preserve
 Crown City Wildlife Area
 Dean State Forets
 Egypt Valley Wilderness Area
 Fernwood State Forest
 Highlandtown Wilderness Area
 Hocking State Forest
 Mohican-Memorial State Forest
 Muskingum River State Park
 Perry State Forest
 Pike State Forest
 Salt Fork State Park
 Shade River State Forest
 Shawnee State Forest
 Strouds Run State Park
 Tar Hollow State Forest
 Tri-Valley Wilderness Area
 Wayne National Forest
 Wolf Creek Wilderness Area
 Woodybury State Wilderness Area
 Zaleski State Forest
 Pennsylvania
 Black Moshannon State Park
 Forbes State Forest
 Gallitzin State Forest
 Laurel Hill State Park
 Laurel Ridge State Park
 Moraine State Park
 Ohiopyle State Park
 Prince Gallitzin State Park
 Raccoon Creek State Park
 Roaring Run Natural Area
 Tennessee
 Big South Fork National River and Recreation Area
 Catoosa Wildlife Management Area
 Fall Creek Falls State Park
 Frozen Head State Park
 Prentice Cooper State Forest
 Scott State Forest
 South Cumberland Recreation Area
 South Cumberland State Park
 Virginia
 Parts of Jefferson National Forest
 Stone Mountain Wilderness
 West Virginia
 Babcock State Park
 Beech Fork State Park
 Blackwater Falls State Park
 Canaan Valley National Wildlife Refuge
 Canaan Valley Resort State Park
 Cedar Creek State Park
 Chief Logan State Park
 Coopers Rock State Forest
 Gauley River National Recreation Area
 Holly River State Park
 Kanawha State Forest
 Monongahela National Forest
 Cranberry Wilderness
 Dolly Sods Wilderness
 Otter Creek Wilderness
 Roaring Plains West Wilderness

See also
 Appalachian temperate rainforest
 Western Allegheny Plateau ecoregion: WWF sub−ecoregion on the western Allegheny Plateau.
 List of ecoregions in the United States (WWF)
 List of ecoregions in the United States (EPA)

References

Bibliography

 
 
 Appalachian mixed mesophytic forests images at bioimages.vanderbilt.edu
 
 Data source for map: Olson, D. M. and E. Dinerstein. The Global 200: Priority ecoregions for global conservation. (PDF file) Annals of the Missouri Botanical Garden 89: pgs. 125-126.

Appalachian forests
Temperate broadleaf and mixed forests in the United States
Ecoregions of the United States
Laurel Highlands
Ecology of the Appalachian Mountains

Plant communities of the Eastern United States
Plant communities of Alabama
Plant communities of Georgia (U.S. state)
Plant communities of Kentucky
Plant communities of Maryland
Plant communities of Ohio
Plant communities of Pennsylvania
Plant communities of Tennessee
Plant communities of Virginia
Plant communities of West Virginia
Appalachian Ohio
East Tennessee
Western Maryland